The Patrick H. Rahilly House is a historic house in Mount Pleasant Township, Minnesota, United States.  It was built in 1880 for Patrick Henry Rahilly (1832–1931), one of southern Minnesota's earliest and most successful farmers and entrepreneurs, who went on to serve in the state legislature.  The house was listed on the National Register of Historic Places in 1975 for its state-level significance in the themes of architecture and politics/government.  It was nominated for its associations with Rahilly and for its exemplary Italianate architecture atypically located in a rural setting.

During a long period of vacancy, the Rahilly House deteriorated from repeated storm damage. On July 26, 2018, Jason Reese purchased the property with intentions to restore the property to its original grandeur.

See also
 National Register of Historic Places listings in Wabasha County, Minnesota

References

External links
 

1880 establishments in Minnesota
Houses completed in 1880
Houses in Wabasha County, Minnesota
Houses on the National Register of Historic Places in Minnesota
Italianate architecture in Minnesota
National Register of Historic Places in Wabasha County, Minnesota